Route 795 is a  long mostly east–west secondary highway in the south-western portion of New Brunswick, Canada, also named Wetmore Creek Rd.

Route description
The route is in western Saint John County.

The route's eastern terminus is near Anderson Lake. It travels mostly east crossing Wetmore Creek, then Hanson Stream where it runs parallel to Route 1, then crossing Atkinson Brook, ending at the intersection of Route 175 and the northern terminus of Route 790 near Lepreau.

History

See also

References

795
795